The Only Witness is a 1990 Bulgarian drama film directed by Mikhail Pandoursky.  It was entered into the main competition at the 47th Venice International Film Festival; for his performance Oleg Borisov won the Volpi Cup for best actor.

Cast 

 Oleg Borisov : Svidetel / Christo Panov
 Kiril Variyski : Shofyor
 Lyuben Chatalov : Vladimir Panov
 Iren Krivoshieva : Georginova

References

External links

1990 films
1990 drama films
Bulgarian drama films